The SS Akasha was a paddle propelled steamship built in 1886 at Fairfield Shipbuilding and Engineering, Govan, Scotland for the British Government's Nile Expedition.

References

External links 
 Shipping Times: Clydebuilt Database

Ships built on the River Clyde
Steamships of the United Kingdom
Ships built in Govan
1886 ships